This page describes the qualifying procedure for the 2012 European Women's Handball Championship.

Qualification system

Seeding 
The draw for the qualification round was held on 27 April 2011 at the EHF headquarters, in Vienna. The host country, the Netherlands, was directly qualified. The remaining 30 teams were divided into several pots according to the "EHF Women's National Team Ranking", and were successfully drawn so that each qualification group contained one team from each pot. The four lowest ranked teams, participated in a pre-qualification tournament to decide the last two spots.

Playing dates
Pre-qualification: June 2011
Rounds 1 and 2: 19–23 October 2011
Rounds 3 and 4: 21–25 March 2012
Rounds 5 and 6: 30 May – 3 June 2012

Pre-Qualification

|}

Game 1

Game 2

Groups 
The draw for the qualification round defined the groups shown below. A provisional match schedule was elaborated and distributed to all national federations taking part in this round.

Key:
Teams highlighted in green qualified for the tournament.

Group 1 

All times are local.

Group 2 

All times are local.

Group 3 

All times are local.

Group 4 

All times are local.

Group 5 

All times are local.

Group 6 

All times are local.

Group 7 

All times are local.

References

External links
EHF Site

2012 European Women's Handball Championship
Qualification for handball competitions